Ariunculus is a genus of air-breathing land slugs in the family Arionidae, the roundback slugs. Sometimes it has been considered as a subgenus of Arion, and sometimes the subgenus Ichnusarion has been raised to generic rank.

Etymology
The stem of Arion plus the suffix -unculus, which is a diminutive in Latin. Hence "little Arion". Pollonera justifies why "Ariunculus" is appropriate rather than "Arionculus" (cf. "homo" and "homunculus").

The subgenus name Ichnusarion is also based on "Arion", to which has been added "Ichnusa", a Latin name of Sardinia, where the single species of this subgenus is endemic.

Species

Only two species are currently recognised:

subgenus Ariuncululus
 Ariunculus speziae Lessona, 1881 – type species of the genus; Italian Alps with one record in Switzerland
subgenus Ichnusarion Pollonera, 1890
 Ariunculus isselii Lessona & Pollonera, 1882 – Sardinia

Other species have been discounted as distinct members of the genus:
 A. mortilleti and A. camerani are considered synonyms of A. speziae (all three were originally described in the same article, but differ only in size and coloration, not genitalia);
 A. moreleti is considered a species of Letourneuxia;
 A. pallaryi matches Letourneuxia numidica in its description;
 A. austriacus has been synonymised with Arion subfuscus;
 A. tricolor and A. nigratus are thought to have been misidentified juveniles of a large Arion;
 A. ischii was apparently a misprint for A. isselii.

Diagnostic characters

Genital characters that have been proposed as diagnostic of the genus are:
 the genital pore is very anterior, anterior to the pneumostome; 
 the atrium is large;
 the duct of the bursa copulatrix opens near the end of the epiphallus;
 the oviduct is long with two bends;
 the epiphallus blends imperceptibly with the vas deferens;
At least in one species of Ariunculus, this last character reflects that sperm is transferred naked rather than in a spermatophore formed in the epiphallus; this is a fundamental contrast with Arion and Geomalacus.

Ariunculus differs from Geomalacus, and is similar to Arion, in that the caudal gland is prominent and the mantle contains only calcareous granules rather than a shell plate.

References

External links 

Arionidae
Gastropod genera